Our First American Friends is the debut album by British alternative rock band Tubelord. It was released on October 12, 2009, through Hassle Records. The album mostly features newly written material but also features re-recorded version of songs such as "Night of the Pencils" and "Propeller" which have been  staples in the band's live set and have been released in limited edition singles prior to the recording of Our First American Friends.

The album has been released on compact disc, digital download and vinyl, which contain a free bonus disc titled One for the Grandparents that featured many of the album's songs which have been completely re-worked acoustically.

Track listing

Personnel
Tubelord
 Joe Prendergast - guitars, lead vocals
 Sean Bamberger - bass guitar, backing vocals
 David Catmur - drums, violin, viola, synthesizer [Casio Vl-1], chimes, glockenspiel, backing vocals

Additional musicians
Caroline Court - additional violin
Rob Stanley-Smith - additional cello
Alan Welsh, James Elliott Field - backing vocals

Production
Tristan Ivemy - producer, engineer
James Elliott Field, Darren Simpson - assistant engineers
John Davis - mastering

References 

2009 debut albums
Tubelord albums
Hassle Records albums